Valdecarros is a station on Line 1 of the Madrid Metro. It is located in fare Zone A. The station opened on 16 May 2007.

References 

Line 1 (Madrid Metro) stations
Railway stations in Spain opened in 2007
Buildings and structures in Villa de Vallecas District, Madrid